The Oregon Early Learning Division, under the authority of the Oregon Department of Education, supports preschool services in the U.S. state of Oregon. The division has three primary objectives:
 ensuring that students are prepared to succeed in Kindergarten
 promoting stable families
 coordinating effective support for families with preschool-aged children

The work of the division is overseen by a 19-member Early Learning Council and the Oregon Chief Education Office. The first director of the Division was Jada Rupley, who served from 2013 to her retirement in August 2014. Governor Kitzhaber appointed Megan Irwin as Rupley's successor in 2015. Miriam Calderon has served as the Early Learning System Director since 2017.

References

External links 

2013 establishments in Oregon
Education in Oregon
Government of Oregon
State agencies of Oregon